Maków Podhalański  (known as Maków until 1930) is a town in southern Poland, on the Skawa river. Population: 5,738 (2006).

Since 1999 situated in Sucha County, Lesser Poland Voivodeship. Previously (1975–1998) in Bielsko-Biala Voivodeship.

External links
 Municipality home page
 Jewish Community in Maków Podhalański on Virtual Shtetl

Cities and towns in Lesser Poland Voivodeship
Sucha County
Populated places in the Kingdom of Galicia and Lodomeria
Kraków Voivodeship (1919–1939)